Richard C. "Dick" Frame (July 16, 1926 – February 24, 1977) was an American politician and attorney who served as a member of the Pennsylvania State Senate from 1962 to 1977.

Career 
He served in the military during World War II. He then earned a degree from Yale University and a law degree from University of Virginia School of Law.

In 1973, he became Republican Senate Leader, defeating Robert D. Fleming. In 1976, he lost that position to Henry G. Hager.

Death 
He died on February 24, 1977, in a plane crash near Harrisburg, Pennsylvania. A bridge on Pennsylvania Route 8 is named after him. In 1986 the Pennsylvania General Assembly designated a section of Pennsylvania Route 8 in Venango County as the Richard C. Frame Memorial Highway.

References

1926 births
1977 deaths
People from Franklin, Pennsylvania
Republican Party Pennsylvania state senators
Pennsylvania lawyers
University of Virginia School of Law alumni
Yale University alumni
Accidental deaths in Pennsylvania
Victims of aviation accidents or incidents in the United States
20th-century American politicians
20th-century American lawyers